Great River Regional Library is a library system serving Benton, 
Morrison, Sherburne, 
Stearns, Todd and Wright Counties in central Minnesota. It is a consolidated library system consisting of 32 branch libraries, with a headquarters at the St. Cloud Public Library.

History
When the hotel which contained St. Cloud's reading room burned down in 1901, the community sought funding from industrialist and philanthropist Andrew Carnegie to build a library. They received $25,000 from Carnegie, along with an additional $2,000 from local railroad executive James J. Hill, and the St. Cloud Public Library opened in 1902. In 1969 the library expanded services to become the Great River Regional Library system. The current St. Cloud Public Library was built in 2008.

Locations
Branch libraries are located in the following cities:
Albany,
Annandale,
Becker,
Belgrade,
Big Lake,
Buffalo,
Clearwater,
Cokato,
Cold Spring,
Delano,
Eagle Bend,
Elk River,
Foley,
Grey Eagle,
Howard Lake,
Kimball,
Little Falls,
Long Prairie,
Melrose,
Monticello,
Paynesville,
Pierz,
Richmond,
Rockford,
Royalton,
St. Cloud,
St. Michael,
Sauk Centre,
Staples,
Swanville,
Upsala, and
Waite Park.

References

External links
Great River Regional Library

County library systems in Minnesota
Education in Benton County, Minnesota
Education in Morrison County, Minnesota
Education in Sherburne County, Minnesota
Education in Stearns County, Minnesota
Education in Todd County, Minnesota
Education in Wright County, Minnesota
Buildings and structures in St. Cloud, Minnesota